Lahmann is a German surname. Notable people with the surname include:

 Heinrich Lahmann (1860–1905), German physician
 Carlos Echandi (1900–1938), Costa Rican surgeon

See also
 Lahman
 Lehmann

German-language surnames